Ernő Metzner (February 25, 1892 – September 25, 1953) was a film director and production designer.

Metzner was born in  Subotica (then Austria-Hungary). He studied art at the Budapest Academy of Fine Arts, then worked as a painter and graphic artist. In 1920 he moved to Berlin and began working as an art director and production designer with some of the best-known German directors of the time:  Ernst Lubitsch (Sumurun, The Loves of Pharaoh), Robert Wiene (I.N.R.I.) and Karl Grune (Arabella). From the 1926 Secrets of a Soul he developed a close and continuous partnership with Georg Wilhelm Pabst. Metzner was art director for seven major Pabst films from 1926 to 1933, notably designing the production of Kameradschaft (1931), for which Metzner constructed realistic mining tunnels in the studio.

In 1927 Metzner began to direct films himself. His first short films are documentaries commissioned by the Social Democratic Party of Germany. His most important work is probably the 1928 short film Polizeibericht Überfall ("Police Report:  Hold-Up", known in English as "Accident"). Metzner both wrote and directed this landmark of the New Objectivity movement in film, banned by authorities as "brutalizing and demoralizing."

As a Hungarian Jew, in 1933 Metzner emigrated from Germany to France and then to England, where he reunited with Austrian director Friedrich Feher. From 1936 Metzner moved with his family to the United States, but found only occasional work in Hollywood.

He died in Hollywood, California on September 25, 1953.

Filmography 

 Sumurun (1920) - Production Design
 The Bull of Olivera (1921) - Costumes
 The Loves of Pharaoh (1922) - Costumes
 Don Juan (1922) - Costumes
 Fridericus Rex (in four parts, 1922-1923) - Production Design
 Salome (1923) - Production Design
 Old Heidelberg (1923) - Production Design
 I.N.R.I. (1923) - Production Design, Costumes
 Explosion] (1923) - Costumes
 Arabella (1924) - Costumes
 Wood Love (1925) - Production Design, Costumes
 Secrets of a Soul (1926) - Production Design
 At the beginning was the Word (1927) - Director 
 Naftalin (1927) - Director
 Free Ride (1928) - Director 
 It rises (1928) - Director
 Mikosch Comes In (1928)
 Accident (1928) - Director, Screenplay
 Destiny (1928) - Director
 Hotel of Secrets (1929) - Production Design
 Diary of a Lost Girl (1929) - Production Design
 The White Hell of Pitz Palu (1929) - Features
 Westfront 1918 (1930) - Production Design
 Rivals for the World Record (1930) - Director, Screenwriter, Production Design
 Kameradschaft (1931) - Production Design
 The Unknown Guest (1931)
 The Firm Gets Married (1931)
 L'Atlantide (1932) - Production Design
 Monsieur, Madame and Bibi (1932) - Production Design
 Scandal on Park Street (1932)
 A Bit of Love (1932)
 Gypsies of the Night (1932)
 The Marathon Runner (1933)
 High and Low (1933) - Production Design
 Princess Charming (1934) - Production Design
 Chu Chin Chow (1934) - Production Design
 Oh, Daddy! (1935) - Production Design
 The Tunnel (1935) - Production Design
 The Robber Symphony (1936) - Production Design
 Seven Sinners (1936) - Production Design
 O.H.M.S. (1937) - Production Design
 Take My Tip (1937) - Production Design
 The Great Awakening (1941) - Production Design
 It Happened Tomorrow (1944) - Production Design
 The Macomber Affair'' (1947) - Production Design

References

External links 
 Erno Metzner in filmportal (German language)
 
 Biography on movie-zeit.de (German language)

1892 births
1953 deaths
German film directors
Film people from Subotica
German production designers
Hungarian Jews
Hungarian University of Fine Arts alumni
Jewish emigrants from Nazi Germany to the United States